Georg Wilhelm Amberger (31 July 1890 – 6 February 1949) was a German track and field athlete who competed in the 1912 Summer Olympics.

In 1912 he was eliminated in the first round of the 1500 metres competition. He was also a member of the German team which was eliminated in the first round of the 3000 metres team race by Sweden.

References

External links
list of German athletes

1890 births
1949 deaths
German male middle-distance runners
Olympic athletes of Germany
Athletes (track and field) at the 1912 Summer Olympics